The Rock Jockeys (later retitled Devil's Wall) is the fourth novel in the World of Adventure series by Gary Paulsen. It was published on March 1, 1995 by Random House. It was later retitled Devil's Wall by Macmillan Children's Books in the UK and released on April 9, 1999.

Plot
The story is about three young boys, the Rock Jockeys, who set out to climb dangerous Devil's Wall hoping to find the remains of a World War II bomber. Once atop the mountain, they find the bomber and his hidden diary.

Novels by Gary Paulsen
1995 American novels
American young adult novels
Random House books